Myriangium is a genus of fungi within the family Myriangiaceae.

Species
As accepted by Species Fungorum;

 Myriangium acaciae 
 Myriangium andinum 
 Myriangium argentinum 
 Myriangium arxii 
 Myriangium asterinosporum 
 Myriangium bambusae 
 Myriangium bauhiniae 
 Myriangium catalinae 
 Myriangium cinchonae 
 Myriangium citri 
 Myriangium curreyoideum 
 Myriangium curtisii 
 Myriangium dolichosporum 
 Myriangium duriaei 
 Myriangium floridanum 
 Myriangium grewiae 
 Myriangium guaraniticum 
 Myriangium haraeanum 
 Myriangium hispanicum 
 Myriangium inconspicuum 
 Myriangium indicum 
 Myriangium kamatii 
 Myriangium montagnei 
 Myriangium myrticola 
 Myriangium parasiticum 
 Myriangium philippinense 
 Myriangium rhipsalidis 
 Myriangium rosicola 
 Myriangium superficiale 
 Myriangium tamarindi 
 Myriangium tectonae 
 Myriangium thallicola 
 Myriangium tuberculans 
 Myriangium tuberculiferum 
 Myriangium tunae 
 Myriangium uleanum 
 Myriangium yunnanense 
 Myriangium ziziphi 

Former species;
 M. bambusae  = Myriangium haraeanum
 M. calami  = Molleriella mirabilis Elsinoaceae family
 M. duriaei''' var. thelephorina  = Myriangium duriaei M. japonicum  = Uleomyces japonicus Cookellaceae
 M. mirabile  = Uleomyces mirabilis Cookellaceae
 M. pritzelianum  = Elsinoe pritzeliana Elsinoaceae
 M. sabaleos  = Myriangiella sabaleos Schizothyriaceae
 M. sulfurea  = Myriangiopsis sulfurea Dothideomycetes
 M. thwaitesii  = Angatia thwaitesii'' Saccardiaceae

References

Myriangiales
Dothideomycetes genera
Taxa named by Camille Montagne
Taxa named by Miles Joseph Berkeley
Taxa described in 1845